The Biryukov equation (or Biryukov oscillator), named after Vadim Biryukov (1946), is a non-linear second-order differential equation used to model damped oscillators.

The equation is given by 
 

where ƒ(y) is a piecewise constant function which is positive, except for small y as

 

 

Eq. (1) is a special case of the Lienard equation; it describes the auto-oscillations.

Solution (1) at a separate time intervals when f(y) is constant is given by

 

 

 
 

The second half-period’s solution is

 

Solution of (1) in the stationary mode thus is obtained by solving a system of algebraic equations as

; ; ; ;
;.

The integration constants are obtained by the Levenberg–Marquardt algorithm. 
(1) named Van der Pol oscillator. Its solution cannot be expressed by elementary functions in closed form.

References

Differential equations
Analog circuits